2gether: The Series ('because we belong together') is a 2020 Thai romantic comedy series starring Vachirawit Chiva-aree and Metawin Opas-iamkajorn. An adaptation of 2019 Thai novel by JittiRain. The series follows the story of two college boys who go from being in a fake romantic relationship into a real couple. Directed by Weerachit Thongjila and produced by GMMTV and Housestories 8, showcased at "2020 New & Next" event on 15 October 2019. It premiered on GMM 25, LINE TV and ICT.

Due to its immense popularity, the series is considered as a major contributors to BL genre in South-east Asia. It became the most-viewed Thai series in LINE TV and YouTube. The success of the series then led to the sequel Still 2gether, and a 2gether: The Movie. In some regions, it's available on Netflix.

Synopsis 
Tine is a ordinary student and cheerleader in the college, while Sarawat campus’ most popular guy is in soccer and music club. When Tine ends up chasing Sarawat for fake date in order to escape Green who has romantic feelings for him.
As the time goes their feelings starts to turn into reality. Before a "happily ever after" the process of falling in love, and the realization that they aren't pretending begins.

Cast and characters

Main 
 Vachirawit Chiva-aree (Bright) as Sarawat Guntithanon
 A popular first-year college student from the Faculty of Political Science, football player, guitarist, member of the Music Club and of the club's band Ctrl+S. Though adored for his good looks, Sarawat is stoic and an introvert who does not have any social media accounts (except for his e-mail). Tine pursues him to become his fake boyfriend in order to give his gay admirer, Green, a strong competitor and make him back out eventually.
 Metawin Opas-iamkajorn (Win) as Tine Teepakorn
 A self-described "chic" and handsome first-year college student from the Faculty of Law, a member of his faculty's cheerleading squad and of the Music Club. Tine has dated many girls but broke up with them and remained single. He then gets constantly bugged by his gay admirer Green and, after failed attempts to drive him away, gets convinced by his friends to make the popular guitarist Sarawat to be his fake boyfriend. Despite his pretend-homosexual relationship with Sarawat, Tine continues to claim that he only likes girls.

Supporting

Music Club 
  (Gun) as Green
 A first-year college student from the Faculty of Humanities and Social Sciences, a member of the Music Club and Dim's boyfriend. Due to his conflicts with Dim, he seeks a new relationship with Tine, his crush with whom he becomes very clingy to. After Dim makes amends with him, he starts their relationship over and lets go of Tine.
  (Guy) as Dim
 Head of the Music Club and Green's boyfriend.
 Pornnappan Pornpenpipat (Nene) as Air
 Secretary of the Music Club.
 Rachanun Mahawan (Film) as Earn
 A member of the Music Club and of the club's band Ctrl+S.
 Pattranite Limpatiyakorn (Love) as Pear
 A member of the Music Club; Tine's crush.

Tine's friends 
 Thanawat Rattanakitpaisan (Khaotung) as Fong
 One of Tine's best friends who gives him advice.
 Pluem Pongpisal as Phuak
 One of Tine's best friends who is working on his own food review blog.
 Chayakorn Jutamat (JJ) as Ohm
 One of Tine's best friends who is a self-proclaimed social media "god"

Sarawat's friends 
  (Gunsmile) as Boss
 One of Sarawat's best friends.
  (Mike) as Man
 One of Sarawat's best friends who likes Tine's elder brother Type.

Others 
  (Drake) as Mil
 A student from the Faculty of Architecture who likes Tine but dislikes Sarawat; later Phukong's love interest.
 Thanatsaran Samthonglai (Frank) as Phukong
 Sarawat's younger brother who has a crush on Mil.
 Jirakit Kuariyakul (Toptap) as Type
 Tine's elder brother; Man's love interest.
 Phakjira Kanrattanasoot (Nanan) as Fang
 Head of the Faculty of Law's cheerleading squad.
  (View) as Noomnim
 One of the girls that Tine had dated who wants "anything" but is too picky. She helps Tine in driving Green away by pretending to be his girlfriend.
 Chalongrat Novsamrong (First) as Chat
 One of Mil's coursemates from the Faculty of Architecture.

Guest role 
 Chiwpreecha Thitichaya (Olive) as Ging (Ep. 1)
 One of the girls that Tine had dated who is overly busy with her studies.
 Sarocha Burintr (Gigie) as Pam (Eps. 12–13)
 Sarawat's high school friend and former crush.
 Patchatorn Thanawat (Ployphat)
 Wanwimol Jensawamethee (June) as Wan
 One of the girls that Tine was teased to by his friends to distract him from Sarawat.

Still 2gether 

On 1 June 2020, GMMTV teased the airing of a five-episode special titled Still 2gether.  scheduled to premiere on GMM 25 and LINE TV on 14 August 2020, airing on Fridays at 21:30 ICT and 23:00 ICT, respectively. The sequel follows where Sarawat (Bright Vachirawit Chivaaree) and Tine (Metawin Opas-iamkajorn), after one year try to balance their relationship and respective passion.

Soundtracks 
Its original soundtrack "คั่นกู" (Kan Goo) ranked No. 1 in Weeks 15 and 17 of Joox Thailand's Top 100.

Scrubb 
Aside from the official soundtrack, a number of songs from Thai band Scrubb are also featured in the series as the character Tine is a fan of the said Thai music band. In an interview, JittiRain, the author of the novel which inspired the series, also mentioned that her being a fan of the band led her to create the novel.

The band also appeared in the show's 6th and 13th episode.

Reception

Thailand television ratings 
 In the table below,  represents the lowest ratings and  represents the highest ratings.

 Based on the average audience share per episode.

Online ratings 
On 1 April 2020, it surpassed 50 million views on LINE TV, where it garnered the highest number of views for the month of March, and 100 million views on 19 April 2020. It also lead in the Top 10 list of most viewed television series in the said platform for the first half of 2020.

International broadcast
2gether: The Series is available for streaming on Netflix since 30 July 2020.
 Taiwan – The series premiered on Taiwan's LINE TV on 18 June 2020 with Mandarin subtitles.
 Philippines – The series was acquired by Dreamscape Entertainment and aired on pay cable and satellite via Kapamilya Channel and online via iWant (now iWantTFC), both owned and operated by ABS-CBN Corporation. It was the first Thai boys' love drama acquired by the TV network in the Philippines. Dubbed in Filipino, the series premiered on iWant on 28 June 2020 and on Kapamilya Channel on 27 July 2020.
 Japan – The series was acquired by Content Seven and premiered on Rakuten TV on 31 July 2020 at 12:00 JST. Succeeding episodes will be released every Fridays thereafter. It also premiered on Wowow Prime on 22 October 2020.

Awards and nominations

Notes

References

External links 
 2gether: The Series on GMM 25 website 
 2gether: The Series  on LINE TV
 
 GMMTV

Television series by GMMTV
2020 Thai television series debuts
2020 Thai television series endings
GMM 25 original programming
Thai romantic comedy television series
Thai boys' love television series
2020s LGBT-related comedy television series
2020s LGBT-related drama television series
Television series by Housestories 8